Corilla anax is a species of air-breathing land snail, a terrestrial pulmonate gastropod mollusk in the family Corillidae.

Distribution
Distribution of Corilla anax includes Sri Lanka.

References

External links
 Corilla anax Benson 1865 India Biodiversity Portal
 Corilla anax (Benson, 1865) Discover Life

Corillidae
Gastropods described in 1865
Taxa named by William Henry Benson